Marianne Bachmeier (3 June 1950 – 17 September 1996) was a German woman who shot and killed the rapist and murderer of her child, Anna, in an act of vigilantism in the District Court of Lübeck in 1981. The case sparked extensive media coverage and public debate. As a result, Bachmeier was convicted of manslaughter and unlawful possession of a firearm. She was sentenced to six years but released on bail after serving three years. Bachmeier moved abroad before returning to Germany after being diagnosed with pancreatic cancer. She died aged 46 and was buried next to her daughter, Anna, in Burgtor Cemetery in Lübeck.

Youth and family
Bachmeier grew up in the small town Sarstedt near Hildesheim in Lower Saxony, West Germany, where her parents had fled after World War II from East Prussia. Her father had been a member of the Waffen-SS. She was raised in a conservative home with devoutly religious parents. Her father was the stereotypical authoritative figure, a heavy drinker who spent much of his time at a bar close to the house. Their household was not pleasant, and drinking made her father more aggressive. Her parents were divorced, and her mother later remarried. Marianne Bachmeier was perceived as a troubled adolescent by - what she described as - a dictatorial stepfather, and her mother eventually kicked her out of the house.
 
In 1966, aged 16, Bachmeier had her first child, whom she placed for adoption as an infant. She became pregnant again at the age of 18 by her boyfriend. Shortly before the birth of her second child, Bachmeier was raped. Her second child was also placed for adoption as an infant.
 
Bachmeier began dating Christian Berthold, the manager of Tipasa, a bar where they both worked, in 1972. She became pregnant for the third time at the age of 22. On 14 November 1972, Bachmeier's third child, Anna, was born, and she raised her alone. As a result, Bachmeier took Anna to work at the pub, and she was said to never feel a need to rush home after her regular hours behind the bar. Bachmeier was aware of her problematic lifestyle and wanted to put Anna up for adoption. Friends later said that Bachmeier treated Anna like a little adult, and from a young age, she was expected to take care of many things on her own. Anna frequently slept in the bar as her mother partied. According to a friend of Bachmeier's, Anna was a vibrant youngster, who never truly had a pleasant family life.

Murder of her daughter
On 5 May 1980, when Anna Bachmeier was seven years old, she had an argument with her mother and decided to skip school. On this day, Anna was abducted by Klaus Grabowski, a 35-year-old butcher, whose home she had visited before to play with his cats. He held Anna for several hours at his home, sexually assaulted her, and ultimately strangled her with a pair of his fiancée's tights. According to the prosecutor, he tied the girl up and packed her in to a box, which he left on the shore of a canal. His fiancée then turned him in to the police.
 
Grabowski was a convicted sex offender and had previously been sentenced for the sexual abuse of two girls. In 1976, he voluntarily submitted to chemical castration, though it was later revealed that he subsequently underwent hormone treatment to try to reverse the castration. Once arrested, Grabowski stated that the girl wanted to tell her mother that he had abused her to extort money from him. He said his fear of going back to prison prompted him to kill her.

Vigilante justice in the courtroom
On 6 March 1981, the third day of the trial and around 10 a.m, Marianne Bachmeier smuggled a Beretta 70 into the courtroom of Lübeck District Court, room 157, and shot the confessed killer of her daughter, Klaus Grabowski, in the back. She aimed the gun at Grabowski's back and fired seven times. Six shots hit him, and the 35-year-old defendant was killed almost instantly. Bachmeier then lowered her gun, without any attempt to flee, and was arrested without resistance.

Public reaction 
The incident is likely the most well-known case of vigilante justice in West Germany. It sparked extensive media coverage, and television crews worldwide travelled to Lübeck to report on this case. Bachmeier sold her life story for about 100,000 Deutsche Mark to the news magazine Stern. With the fee, she covered her legal costs.
 
While held in custody, many sent her messages of support, gifts, and flowers to indicate their understanding of her conduct. However, some still believed that a constitutional state must not tolerate vigilantism. However, after Stern published her life story, and details about her first two children and her father's connection to the Waffen-SS came to light, public opinion shifted as she no longer appeared to fit the "innocent mother" image. Many blame the judiciary for allowing a man who had molested two girls to use hormones to restore his sex drive. Others accused Bachmeier of having neglected Anna and doubted the authenticity of her grief. Still, many openly express their sympathy for the act of revenge.

Sentence for manslaughter 
On 2 November 1982, Bachmeier was initially charged in court with murder. Later the prosecution dropped the murder charge. After 28 days of negotiations, the Board agreed on the verdict. Four months after the opening of proceedings, she was convicted on 2 March 1983 by the Circuit Court Chamber of the District Court Lübeck for manslaughter and unlawful possession of a firearm. The court largely followed the defence's argument that the act was unplanned. She was sentenced to six years in prison but was released after serving three years.

Moving abroad 
Marianne Bachmeier married a teacher in 1985. In 1988, they moved to Accra, Ghana. They lived in a German camp where her husband taught at a German school. They were divorced in 1990, and she moved to Sicily, where she worked as a euthanasia assistant in a hospice in Palermo. She was diagnosed with pancreatic cancer in Sicily, and then returned to Germany.

Subsequent public coverage 
In 1994, 13 years after her act, Marianne Bachmeier gave an interview to the Deutschlandfunk 7 radio. The same year, her autobiography appeared with the German publisher Schneekluth-Verlag. On 21 September 1995, she appeared on the talk show Fliege on the Das Erste TV channel where she admitted to shooting her daughter's killer after careful consideration to enforce the law on him, and to prevent him from further spreading lies about her daughter Anna. In an ARD documentary from 2006, a former friend also said that Marianne Bachmeier practised shooting in the basement under her pub after Anna's murder. Marianne Bachmeier never publicly regretted her act of revenge.

Death 

 
Before her death, she asked the Norddeutscher Rundfunk (NDR) reporter, Lukas Maria Böhmer, to accompany her and film the last stages of her life.
 
On 17 September 1996, Bachmeier died at the age of 46 from pancreatic cancer in a hospital in Lübeck. She was buried beside her daughter, Anna, in a Burgtor Cemetery in Lübeck.

In popular culture

Plays 
In the early 1980s, the Anna Collective, a group made up of Aida Jordão, Suzanne Odette Khuri, Ann-Marie MacDonald, Patricia Nichols, Baņuta Rubess, Tori Smith, Barb Taylor, and Maureen White, began work on a theatre piece about Bachmeier and her vigilante act. A short version of the play premiered in 1983. The completed play, This is for You, Anna, premiered in 1984.

Cinema 
 
 1984: , film by Burkhard Driest (with Gudrun Landgrebe)
 1984: , film by Hark Bohm (with )
 1996: The slow death of Marianne Bachmeier, film by Lukas Maria Böhmer.

Documentaries 
 
 1993: Vigilante justice of a mother: The case of Marianne Bachmeier an interview with Bachmeier by Mirror TV
 2006: Marianne Bachmeier's revenge, documentary of the show Die großen Kriminalfälle (season 5, episode 28) on the ARD channel
 2017: When women kill: Marianne Bachmeier, documentary of the show Spectacular Criminal Cases on ZDF channel

Books

See also
Gary Plauché
Ellie Nesler

Notes

References

External link 
 
 

 

1950 births
1996 deaths
20th-century German women
Deaths from cancer in Germany
Deaths from pancreatic cancer
German people convicted of manslaughter
People from Sarstedt
Vigilantes
Vigilantism against sex offenders